A partial solar eclipse will occur on Friday, June 21, 2058. A solar eclipse occurs when the Moon passes between Earth and the Sun, thereby totally or partly obscuring the image of the Sun for a viewer on Earth. A partial solar eclipse occurs in the polar regions of the Earth when the center of the Moon's shadow misses the Earth.

This event will mark the beginning of Saros series 157.

Related eclipses

Solar eclipses 2054–2058

Metonic series

References

External links 
 NASA graphics

2058 6 21
2058 in science
2058 6 21
2058 6 21